Valapattanam railway station (code: VLPM) is a railway station in Kannur district, Kerala and falls under the Palakkad railway division of the Southern Railway zone, Indian Railways.

Express Trains that halt at this station include:
 Mangalore–Chennai Egmore Express 
 Kannur–Bangalore City Express
 Mangalore–Nagercoil Parasuram Express
 Mangalore–Trivandrum Express

References 

Railway stations in Kannur district
Railway stations opened in 1904